The 2002 MTV Video Music Awards Japan were hosted by the Japanese comedy duo London Boots Ichi-gō Ni-gō at the Tokyo International Forum in Tokyo, Japan.

Performances 
 Namie Amuro
 Boyz II Men
 Chemistry
 Sheryl Crow – "Soak Up the Sun"
 Dragon Ash
 Ayumi Hamasaki – "Free & Easy"
 Jay-Z
 Joe
 Mr. Children
 Nickelback – "How You Remind Me"
 Oasis
 Rip Slyme

Presenters 
 Ayaka Seto – presented Best Video from a Film

Winners and nominees
Finalists in 13 categories were chosen by MTV Japan viewers and a selection committee comprising MTV personnel and industry experts. Japanese and Western acts that released music and/or a music video in Japan between January 1, 2001, and February 28, 2002, were eligible for nomination. Winners were decided based on voting results and the committee's choice.

Winners are highlighted in bold.

Special awards

Inspiration Award — Japan
Namie Amuro

Inspiration Award — International
Jay-Z

Best Asian Artist
Jay Chou

Legend Award
Jimmy Page

References

MTV
2002 in Japanese music
2002 in Tokyo